Sharath may refer to:
 Sharreth (born 1969), Indian music director primarily in Malayalam, but also in Hindi, Tamil and Telugu, cinema
 Sharath (actor) (born 1989), Indian film actor, TV anchor and dancer who works in Kannada cinema.